The men's individual pursuit competition at the 2019 European Games was held at the Minsk Velodrome on 29 June 2019.

Results

Qualifying
The first two riders raced for gold, the third and fourth fastest rider raced for the bronze medal.

Finals

References

Men's individual pursuit